Waterville Valley is a New England town in Grafton County, New Hampshire, United States. The population was 508 at the 2020 census, up from 247 at the 2010 census.

It is a resort town which attracts many visitors in the winter months with alpine skiing at Waterville Valley Resort and many miles of trails for cross-country skiing. During the summer, attractions include a golf course, tennis courts, and a variety of hiking options. The Mad River flows through the town, providing great views all year round.

History 
The area was first settled in the 1760s, and incorporated as "Waterville" in 1829. The name "Waterville Valley" was adopted in 1967.

Geography 
The central part of the town is drained by the Mad River, which flows southwest toward the Pemigewasset River, part of the Merrimack River watershed. The southeast part of town is drained by the Whiteface and Wonalancet rivers, south-flowing tributaries of the Bearcamp River and part of the Saco River watershed. The northeast part of the town is drained by the Swift River, another tributary of the Saco.

Other 4000-footers in the town include Mount Tecumseh in the west (formerly listed as  but recently revised to ), and Mounts Whiteface and Passaconaway {) in the east. Sandwich Mountain is on the southern border.

Demographics 

As of the census of 2000, there were 257 people, 121 households, and 75 families residing in the town.  The population density was 4.0 people per square mile (1.5/km).  There were 1,097 housing units at an average density of 16.9 per square mile (6.5/km).  The racial makeup of the town was 97.28% White, 1.95% Asian, 0.78% from other races. Hispanic or Latino of any race were 1.56% of the population.

There were 121 households, out of which 27.3% had children under the age of 18 living with them, 45.5% were married couples living together, 9.1% had a female householder with no husband present, and 38.0% were non-families. 34.7% of all households were made up of individuals, and 6.6% had someone living alone who was 65 years of age or older.  The average household size was 2.12 and the average family size was 2.72.

In the town, the population was spread out, with 22.2% under the age of 18, 6.6% from 18 to 24, 20.6% from 25 to 44, 37.0% from 45 to 64, and 13.6% who were 65 years of age or older.  The median age was 45 years. For every 100 females, there were 104.0 males.  For every 100 females age 18 and over, there were 108.3 males.

The median income for a household in the town was $40,417, and the median income for a family was $55,625. Males had a median income of $34,167 versus $34,063 for females. The per capita income for the town was $26,400.  About 6.8% of families and 6.2% of the population were below the poverty line, including 6.7% of those under the age of eighteen and none of those 65 or over.

Education 

The Waterville Valley Elementary School is also known as the "Little Red School" and had 41 students enrolled in kindergarten through 8th grade for the 2011–2012 school year. The children at the school are able to bike, swim, ski, skate, and play tennis in Waterville Valley. There is a recreation department attached to the "Little Red School".

The Waterville Valley Academy (WVA) is a ski academy, founded in 1972.  The campus is located at 88 Boulder Path Rd, at the foot of Snow's Mountain. It has around 160 students and is part of the WVBBTS ski club, the oldest ski club in America. In 2013, the school expanded its academic programming and began to offer a full-year program known as the Pinnacle Program.

Culture 
Since 1994, Waterville Valley has hosted the Russell Sage Foundation Summer Institute in Behavioral Economics (BE). 2016 Economics Nobel Laureate Richard Thaler describes the institute as an important driver of the early growth of behavioral economics.

Notable people 

 Tom Corcoran (1931–2017), resort founder, Olympic skier
 John E. Sununu (born 1964), US congressman, senator

References

External links 

 
 New Hampshire Economic and Labor Market Information Bureau Profile
 Waterville Valley resort
 Waterville Valley Association Records at Dartmouth College Library

 
Towns in Grafton County, New Hampshire
Towns in New Hampshire